Strawberry-blonde or blond may refer to:

 Strawberry blonde (hair color)
 The Strawberry Blonde, a 1941 film directed by Raoul Walsh
 "Strawberry Blonde", a 2008 song by The Subways from All or Nothing
 "Strawberry Blond", a 2013 song by Mitski from Retired from Sad, New Career in Business
 "Strawberry Blonde (The Band Rocked On)", a 1960 song by Frank D'Rone
 Strawberry Blonde, a variety of Helianthus (sunflower)